Vijay Kumar may refer to:

 Vijay Kumar (cricketer) (born 1975), Indian cricketer
 V. S. Vijay Kumar (1944–2019), Indian cricketer
 Vijay Kumar (sport shooter) (born 1985), sport shooter and Olympic silver medalist from India
 Vijay Kumar (roboticist) (born 1962), Indian-American professor
 Vijay C. Kumar (fl. 1988–2017), Indian Telugu film director
 K. Vijay Kumar (born 1952), Indian police officer
 Vijay Kumar (Tamil filmmaker) (born 1987)
 Vijay Kumar (molecular biologist) (born 1954), Indian molecular biologist

See also
 Vijayakumar (disambiguation)